People's Defence Force – Kalay  (Burmese: ပြည်သူ့ကာကွယ်ရေးတပ်ဖွဲ့ (ကလေး) abbreviated PDF Kalay) is a local defence force operating in Kalaymyo, Sagain. It was formed by Myanmar youths under the National Unity Government and pro-democracy activists in 2021 in response to the coup d'état that occurred on 1 February 2021 and the ongoing violence in Myanmar by the military junta. The force comprises 12 battalions.

References 

 
 
 


2021 establishments in Myanmar
Military units and formations established in 2021
Paramilitary organisations based in Myanmar
Rebel groups in Myanmar